The Europe/Africa Zone was one of the three zones of the regional Davis Cup competition in 1993.

In the Europe/Africa Zone there were three different tiers, called groups, in which teams competed against each other to advance to the upper tier. Winners in Group III advanced to the Europe/Africa Zone Group II in 1994. All other teams remained in Group III.

Participating nations

Draw
Group A
 Venue: Lusaka Tennis Club, Lusaka, Zambia
 Date: 28 April–2 March

  and  promoted to Group II in 1994.

Group B
 Venue: Marsa Sports Club, Marsa, Malta
 Date: 5–9 March

  and  promoted to Group II in 1994.

Group A

Congo vs. Zambia

Latvia vs. Turkey

San Marino vs. Slovenia

Congo vs. Slovenia

Latvia vs. San Marino

Turkey vs. Zambia

Congo vs. San Marino

Latvia vs. Zambia

Slovenia vs. Turkey

Congo vs. Turkey

Latvia vs. Slovenia

San Marino vs. Zambia

Congo vs. Latvia

San Marino vs. Turkey

Slovenia vs. Zambia

Group B

Benin vs. Malta

Djibouti vs. Ukraine

Estonia vs. Togo

Benin vs. Ukraine

Djibouti vs. Togo

Estonia vs. Malta

Benin vs. Estonia

Djibouti vs. Malta

Togo vs. Ukraine

Benin vs. Djibouti

Estonia vs. Ukraine

Malta vs. Togo

Benin vs. Togo

Djibouti vs. Estonia

Malta vs. Ukraine

Notes

References

External links 
 Davis Cup official website

Davis Cup Europe/Africa Zone
Europe Africa Zone Group III